Tommy Banks, M.D., (born c. 1979) is a former American football fullback.

Born in West Monroe, Louisiana, he starred at West Monroe High School under legendary coach Don Shows before earning a scholarship to Louisiana State University, where he played from 1997 to 2000.  Banks cemented his place in LSU lore by scoring a touchdown in an upset win over the top ranked and defending national champion Florida Gators in 1997.  On the play, he dove into the end zone with a defender draped on him, for a 7-yard touchdown that put LSU up 14-0.  The dive was immortalized in the October 20, 1997 issue of Sports Illustrated, which contained an article recapping the game.  Banks ended his LSU career with a record tying two touchdown performance in LSU's 28-14 victory over Georgia Tech in the 2000 Peach Bowl.

To this day, satirical Tommy Banks references are routinely made in LSU post-game radio shows.

References

Year of birth missing (living people)
Living people
American football fullbacks
LSU Tigers football players
People from West Monroe, Louisiana
Players of American football from Louisiana
West Monroe High School alumni